The 965th Airborne Air Control Squadron is part of the 552d Air Control Wing at Tinker Air Force Base, Oklahoma.  It operates Boeing E-3 Sentry aircraft conducting airborne command and control missions.

The first two antecedents of the squadron were active during World War II.  The 595th Bombardment Squadron served as an Operational and Replacement Training Unit, before being inactivated in a general reorganization of Army Air Forces training units.  The 165th Liaison Squadron performed special operations in India and Burma from September 1944 until the end of the war, when it returned to the United States for inactivation.

The unit's other predecessor unit was activated in 1955 as the 965th Airborne Early Warning and Control Squadron.  It performed air defense patrols off the Pacific coast of the United States until inactivating in 1971.  It was activated again at Tinker Air Force Base, Oklahoma in 1978 as the 965th Airborne Warning and Control Squadron,

Mission
Provide the combat Air Force with airborne systems and personnel for surveillance, warning and control of strategic, tactical, and special mission forces.

History

World War II

Bombardment training

The 595th Bombardment Squadron was first activated at Mountain Home Army Air Field, Idaho on 16 February 1943 as one of the four original squadrons of the 396th Bombardment Group. After initial organization and equipping with Boeing B-17 Flying Fortress heavy bombers, the squadron moved to Moses Lake Army Air Base, Washington.  There the squadron acted as an Operational Training Unit (OTU) for B-17 units. The OTU program involved the use of an oversized parent unit to provide cadres  to "satellite groups"  In August 1943, the unit's mission changed to being a Replacement Training Unit (RTU).  Like OTUs, RTUs were an oversized units.  Their mission, however was to train individual pilots or aircrews.

In November 1943, the 595th moved to Drew Field, Florida, where it would remain for the duration of its active service. However, the Army Air Forces was finding that standard military units, based on relatively inflexible tables of organization were not well adapted to the training mission.  Accordingly, it adopted a more functional system in which each base was organized into a separate numbered unit. The 592d was inactivated on 1 May 1944 at Drew Field, Florida.
Its personnel and equipment became part of the 326th AAF Base Unit.

Special operations in Burma

The 165th Liaison Squadron was activated at Asansol, India as part of the 1st Air Commando Group in September 1944. It flew evacuation missions and provided light transport services for ground forces in Burma from 6 October 1944 until 23 April 1945.  It returned to Asansol that month and remained there until October, when it returned to the United States and was inactivated at the port of embarkation.

Air defense patrols

The 965th Airborne Early Warning and Control Squadron was activated in August 1955 at McClellan Air Force Base, California.  It flew long range surveillance, beginning in the late 1950s and rotated aircrews to Southeast Asia from, after about 4 April 1965 until it was inactivated in June 1971.

Airborne warning and control
The 965th was reactivated at Tinker Air Force Base, Oklahoma in 1978 to fly the Boeing E-3 Sentry.  The squadron became non-operational the following year, although it remained on the active list.  It resumed operations in 1984.  The following year, the lineage of the 595th Bombardment Squadron and 165th Liaison Squadron were consolidated with the squadron.  It flew combat support missions over Panama from, 20 December 1989 – 24 January 1990 and in Southwest Asia from, 17 January – 6 March 1991.

Operations
World War II
Vietnam War
Operation Just Cause
Gulf War
Iraq War
Operation Enduring Freedom

Lineage
 595th Bombardment Squadron
 Constituted as the 595th Bombardment Squadron (Heavy) on 29 January 1943
 Activated on 16 February 1943
 Inactivated on 1 May 1944
 Consolidated with the 165th Liaison Squadron and the 965th Airborne Warning and Control Squadron as the 965th Airborne Warning and Control Squadron on 19 September 1985

 165th Liaison Squadron
 Constituted as the 165th Liaison Squadron (Commando) on 9 August 1944
 Activated on 3 September 1944
 Inactivated on 3 Nov 1945
 Consolidated with the 595th Bombardment Squadron and the 965th Airborne Warning and Control Squadron as the 965th Airborne Warning and Control Squadron on 19 September 1985

 965th Airborne Air Control Squadron
 Constituted as the 965th Airborne Early Warning and Control Squadron on 28 April 1955
 Activated on 8 August 1955
 Inactivated on 30 June 1971
 Redesignated 965th Airborne Warning and Control Squadron on 28 February 1978
 Activated on 1 July 1978
 Consolidated with the 595th Bombardment Squadron and the 165th Liaison Squadron on 19 September 1985
 Redesignated 965th Airborne Air Control Squadron on 1 July 1994

Assignments
 396th Bombardment Group, 16 February 1943 – 1 May 1944
 1st Air Commando Group, 3 September 1944 – 3 November 1945
 552d Airborne Early Warning and Control Wing, 8 August 1955 – 30 June 1971
 552d Airborne Warning and Control Wing (later 552 Airborne Warning and Control Division, 552 Airborne Warning and Control Wing, 552 Air Control Wing), 1 July 1978
 552d Operations Group, 29 May 1992 – present

Stations

 Mountain Home Army Air Field, Idaho, 16 February 1943
 Moses Lake Army Air Base, Washington, 10 April 1943
 Drew Field, Florida, 5 Nov 1943 – 1 May 1944
 Asansol, India, 3 September 1944
 Tamu, Burma, 14 October 1944
 Yazagyo, Burma, 6 November 1944
 Asansol, India, 27 November 1944
 Kawlin, Burma, 28 December 1944 (detachment operated from Inbaung, Burma, 3–22 January 1945)

 Ye-U, Burma, 10 January 1945
  Asansol, India, 21 February 1945
 Shwebo, Burma, 22 January 1945
 Sinthe, Burma, 14 March 1945
 Asansol, India, 25 April–6 October 1945
 Camp Kilmer, New Jersey, 1–3 November 1945
 McClellan Air Force Base, California, 8 August 1955 – 30 June 1971
 Tinker Air Force Base, Oklahoma, 1 Jul 1978 – present)

Aircraft
 Boeing B-17 Flying Fortress (1943–1944)
 Norduyn C-64 Norseman (1944–1945)
 Stinson L-5 Sentinel (1944–1945)
 Lockheed RC-121 Constellation (1955–1963)
 Lockheed EC-121 Warning Star (1963–1971)
 Boeing E-3 Sentry (1978–1979, 1984–present)

References

Bibliography

External links
552d Operations Group Fact Sheet

Military units and formations in Oklahoma
965
1955 establishments in Oklahoma